Allegory of the Planets and Continents is a 1752 painting by Italian artist Giovanni Battista Tiepolo. Done in oil on canvas, the allegorical work uses human figures to represent members of the Greco-Roman pantheon, the planets, and four continents. The painting is an elaborate oil sketch made by Tiepolo in preparation for rendering a similar, larger version of his scene a massive fresco. Between December 1750 and November 1753, Tiepolo was commissioned to decorate the Prince-Bishopric of Würzburg Karl Philipp von Greifenclau zu Vollraths newly constructed palace on the ceiling of a staircase he created a massive fresco of over 600 m², it is considered the largest fresco in the world and is often considered his greatest achievement.  The oil on canvas is an earlier version of his work. The intricate painting depicts figures circling around Tiepolo's rendering of Apollo, the sun god; this represents planets orbiting the Sun. The cornice of the painting symbolize the continents Europe, America, Africa, and Asia.

References 

1752 paintings
Paintings by Giovanni Battista Tiepolo
Paintings in the collection of the Metropolitan Museum of Art
Paintings of Apollo
Angels in art
Birds in art
Deer in art
Elephants in art
Horses in art
Musical instruments in art
Native Americans in art
Seashells in art
Sun in art